Martin Bagness is a British orienteering competitor, and double British Champion.

Career
Bagness received a silver medal in relay at the 1993 World Orienteering Championships in West Point, together with Jonathan Musgrave, Stephen Palmer and Steven Hale, only 15 seconds behind the Swiss winning team. He finished 5th in the relay in 1983, 20th in the individual event in 1985, and 16th in the individual event in 1987.

See also
 List of orienteers
 List of orienteering events

References

Year of birth missing (living people)
Living people
British orienteers
Male orienteers
Foot orienteers
World Orienteering Championships medalists